Adenogramma is a genus of flowering plants belonging to the family Molluginaceae.

Its native range is Southern Africa.

Species:
 Adenogramma asparagoides Adamson 
 Adenogramma capillaris (Eckl. & Zeyh.) Druce

References

Molluginaceae
Taxa named by Ludwig Reichenbach
Caryophyllales genera